I'm Alive is the lead and title track by Jackson Browne from his 1993 album I'm Alive.

The song reached #18 on the Mainstream Rock Tracks Chart and #28 on the Adult Contemporary Chart in the United States.

Charts

Weekly charts
Singles - Billboard (United States)

Year-end charts

References

1993 songs
Elektra Records singles
Jackson Browne songs
Songs written by Jackson Browne
Song recordings produced by Don Was
Song recordings produced by Jackson Browne